The Link Alive is the first live concert DVD released by the French metal band Gojira. The show was filmed in Bordeaux in 2003. The material is mostly older songs from The Link and Terra Incognita, as well as earlier demos. The extra features include several behind-the-scenes documentary, music videos, history, a photo gallery and some short clips, the DVD also contains some hidden 'Easter Eggs'.

The Link Alive was also released as a live album CD on 30 October 2004. It features identical track listings and credits to the DVD. The album was limited to only 500 copies.

On 25 September 2012, Listenable Records offering the re-release of the DVD in North America.

Track listing

Boycott Records

Mon Slip – MS 07 (CD/DVD)

Listenable Records – POSH 070

Easter Eggs 
There are a number of videos hidden in the DVD menus, These short clips are about Tchang & Tangui, fictional characters played by Mario Duplantier and Stéphane Chateauneuf. The stories usually depict mock martial arts fights between the two characters. Some of the locations where the videos can be found are listed below.

Video 1: On the 'Bonus' page, Highlight 'Gojira is...' and press right on your DVD remote to reveal the letters 'T&T1' and press enter.

Video 2: Unknown!

Video 3: On the main menu highlight 'Bonus' then press right, followed by down on your DVD remote to reveal the letters 'T&T3' and press enter.

Video 4: On the 'Bonus' page, Highlight 'Menu' and press up on your DVD remote to reveal the letters 'T&T4' press enter, you will notice you remain on the same page, at this point press 'Menu' or the button that resumes the video to play this selection.

Video 5: Unknown!

Video 6: On the 'Live' page highlight 'Terra Inc.' and press right followed by left on your DVD remote to reveal the letters 'T&T6' and press enter.

Personnel 
 Joe Duplantier – vocals, rhythm guitar
 Christian Andreu – lead guitar
 Jean-Michel Labadie – bass
 Mario Duplantier – drums

References 

Gojira (band) video albums
2004 live albums
Live video albums
2004 video albums
Gojira (band) albums